Twin Town is a 1997 Welsh dark comedy crime drama film, filmed mainly around Port Talbot and set in Swansea, Wales. It was directed by Kevin Allen and had a working title of Hot Dog; a hot dog van features in a number of scenes in the film. It stars real-life brothers Rhys Ifans (in his first major movie role) and Llŷr Ifans (credited as Llyr Evans) along with Dougray Scott. The director appears on screen, briefly seen as a show host on a TV set in the static caravan home of the twins while co-writer Paul Durden briefly appears as a rude taxi driver.

Plot
Set in Port Talbot and Swansea, the Lewis "twins" of the title are not twins but brothers. They live with their parents and sister Adie in a caravan on a mobile home site. Constantly mocking their sister's employment at a local massage parlour, they spend most of their time joking around, taking drugs and stealing cars.

Their father "Fatty Lewis", falls from a ladder while doing roofing work for Bryn Cartwright, a wealthy, prominent local businessman and small-time gangster. Laying blame, the twins attempt to demand workers' compensation for the accident. Bryn claims it was a cash arrangement with no legal representation and refuses the request for compensation. The twins take this personally and seek revenge by gatecrashing and ruining a local karaoke competition in which Bryn's daughter, beautiful Bonny is singing, by appearing from back stage and urinating on her during the performance in the Barons nightclub in Swansea. Bryn vows to get even and acquires the help of his associates Greyo and Terry (two corrupt police detectives), to assist him getting revenge on the twins. After several efforts to disrupt their way of life, Bryn appears to succeed by having one of the detectives to assist him in beating up the twins down a back street.

As retaliation continues, the feud spirals out of control, progressing with the twins breaking into Bryn's property and beheading the Cartwrights' pet poodle. Terry Walsh responds by setting fire to the Lewis' dog's kennel with their pet inside. However, an adjacent gas bottle explodes, destroying the Lewises' mobile home and killing the twins' family. Clearly upset, the twins make arrangements with the local male voice choir and steal their father's hearse at his funeral. Terry meanwhile, much to Greyo's distress, accuses Fatty's co-workers Dai and Chip of destroying the caravan by placing items from the scene of the crime in their builder's van. The twins soon come down from the hills where they have been hiding out and go after Bryn, breaking into his house again and tying him up with washing line rigged to his own electric garage door. The twins ask to borrow Bryn's boat to which he agrees, with the hope of the twins letting him go unhurt. The twins disappear leaving Bryn tied up and at the brink of asphyxiation in his own garage. Upon arrival of Lucy later that evening, she attempts to use the electric gate remote from outside while returning home, causing the garage door to lift and subsequently cause the hanging of her husband Bryn. By looking under the door and noticing the hanging, Lucy hysterically runs through the house and finds their daughter floating on a lilo in their indoor swimming pool listening to music through headphones, blissfully unaware of what had gone on.

The twins consider their job done and grant their father's wish of having a burial at sea with the assistance of Bryn's boat, with the coffin respectfully draped in the Welsh flag. It is a poignant moment as the local choir (formed from a number of real-life local male voice choirs) sing the Welsh language song Myfanwy at the end of Mumbles Pier. Meanwhile, Terry Walsh, terrified and pleading, has been gagged and bound to the coffin, and lowered into the sea just off the pier head of Mumbles Swansea. The coffin floats for a while before the twins make a bet to how long the coffin would stay afloat, seemingly brushing aside the emotion of their father's funeral at sea.

The coffin sinks and a few tears are shed by the twins. The twins then question each other on how far the boat would travel and imply that they would be heading to Morocco. The boat is last seen heading out to sea, driven by the twins to a haunting choir still singing on Mumbles Pier.

Cast

 Llŷr Ifans as Julian Lewis 
 Rhys Ifans as Jeremy Lewis
 Huw Ceredig as Fatty Lewis
 Rachel Scorgie as Adie Lewis
 Di Botcher as Jean Lewis
 Dougray Scott as D.I Terry Walsh
 Dorien Thomas as D.I Alan 'Greyo' Grey
 William Thomas as Bryn Cartwright
 Jenny Evans  as Bonny Cartwright
 Sue Roderick as Lucy Cartwright
 Brian Hibbard as Dai Rhys
 Morgan Hopkins as Chip Roberts
 Buddug Williams as Mrs Mort
 Ronnie Williams as Mr Mort
 Boyd Clack as the Vicar

Reception 

On Rotten Tomatoes the film has a score of  based on reviews from  critics.

Roger Ebert gave the film two stars out of four, saying that he "was not sure where the movie wanted to go and what it wanted to do--this despite the fact that it goes many places and does too much." He also compared it unfavourably to Trainspotting, which had been released the previous year.
William Thomas of Empire gave it 4 out of 5 and wrote that the film "is low-life and proud of it. It's gritty, brutal and not for the faint of heart." He calls the comparisons to Trainspotting "a masterstroke of marketing but far from accurate".

The film was entered into the 47th Berlin International Film Festival.

The Welsh former international rugby union referee, Nigel Owens, stated that the movie was his favourite one.

Documentary and sequel
The 1997 TV documentary Shoot Out in Swansea: The Making of "Twin Town", by Richard Barber, looked at the making of Twin Town and featured interviews with the cast and crew of the film.

In April 2009 director Kevin Allen revealed plans for a sequel, stating that Rhys and Llŷr Ifans were willing to reprise their roles. The plans for a sequel, which would have seen the pair return from North Africa as Muslim converts, were called off in 2012, however, when Allen changed direction in his life and became a pig farmer. In 2016 Allen stated in a Wales Online article that he is working on a sequel set around the Llanelli area, Allen says it will again be a comedy but with a political spin regarding the legalisation of marijuana.

See also
 Mine All Mine

References

External links

 

1997 films
1990s black comedy films
British black comedy films
British coming-of-age films
Films directed by Kevin Allen
Films set in Wales
Films shot in Wales
Films set in Swansea
Films shot in Swansea
British drama films
PolyGram Filmed Entertainment films
Gramercy Pictures films
1997 directorial debut films
1997 comedy films
1990s British films